Waterford Intermediate Football Championship is a second tier Gaelic Athletic Association competition between Gaelic football clubs organised by Waterford GAA. The winning club is eligible to play in the senior grade the following year for the Waterford Senior Football Championship. The winning club also represents Waterford GAA in the Munster Intermediate Club Football Championship. Each of the two divisions of Waterford GAA - East Division and West Division - organises its own competition, with the two winners contesting the county final.

Qualification for subsequent competitions

Munster Intermediate Club Football Championship
The Waterford IFC winners qualify for the Munster Intermediate Club Football Championship. It is the only team from County Waterford to qualify for this competition. The Waterford IFC winners enter the Munster Intermediate Club Football Championship at the __ stage. For example, 2004 winner Gaultier played in the Munster IFC final.

All-Ireland Intermediate Club Football Championship
The Waterford IFC winners — by winning the Munster Intermediate Club Football Championship — may qualify for the All-Ireland Intermediate Club Football Championship, at which they would enter at the __ stage.

History
The competition attracted significant national attention in 2020 when a player competed despite awaiting the result of a COVID-19 test, which returned a positive result. This led to Dungarvan (that year's competition-winning club) being stripped of the title.

Roll of honour

References

External links
 https://www.dungarvangaa.ie/match-reports/

2
Intermediate Gaelic football county championships